RMSC may refer to:

 Red Mountain Ski Club, the original name of Red Mountain Resort in British Columbia, Canada
 Rizal Memorial Sports Complex, a national sports facility in the Philippines 
 Rochester Museum and Science Center, a science and nature museum in New York state, US
 The Rose M. Singer Center, a facility located on Rikers Island

See also 
 RSMC (disambiguation)